Parque de las Ciencias Luis A. Ferré is an educational and recreational park located in Bayamón, Puerto Rico focused on science-related exhibitions. It is one of multiple touristic attractions inaugurated under the leadership of longtime mayor Ramon Luis Rivera and is named in honor of former Governor of Puerto Rico Luis A. Ferré. The park closed for renovations on February, 2011. It reopened on January 10, 2016 after renovations at the cost of eleven million dollars.

Park features
Some of the main features of the park are a natural observatory set on a hill at 285 feet (87m) above sea level, a zoo, and an artificial lake. It also features exhibitions of archaeology, space exploration, transportation, science and health, among many others.

The park also includes parks dedicated to late comedian José Miguel Agrelot and child entertainer Joaquín Monserrat ("Pacheco").

The park occupies  and connects with several main highways.

As of January 2016, the prices are:

Adults: $10 
Kids (2-12): $8 
Elderly (65+): $5 
People with disabilities: $5

Some attractions such as the Mini Golf, Bungee Trampoline, Cups, Carousel, and Human Gyroscope have additional costs.

Gallery

See also
  Tourism in Puerto Rico
  Bayamón, Puerto Rico

References

External links
Parque de las Ciencias at the Bayamón website.
Article about the park
TripAdvisor reviews of the park

Science museums in Puerto Rico
Transport museums in Puerto Rico
Museums in Bayamón, Puerto Rico